Felimida macfarlandi is a species of colorful sea slug, a dorid nudibranch, a marine gastropod mollusk in the family Chromodorididae.

Taxonomy
This species was first described by Theodore Dru Alison Cockerell in 1901 and named Chromodoris mcfarlandi. Cockerell went on to give a fuller description of this species in 1902. It has also been known as Glossodoris macfarlandi.

Description
The body grows to a length of 44 mm.

Distribution
This species occurs in the Pacific Ocean from Central California, USA to Baja California, Mexico

References

 Debelius, H. & Kuiter, R.H. (2007) Nudibranchs of the world. ConchBooks, Frankfurt, 360 pp.  page(s): 180 
 Behrens D.W., Gosliner T.M. & Hermosillo A. (2009) A new species of dorid nudibranch (Mollusca) from the Revillagigedo Islands of the Mexican Pacific. Proceedings of the California Academy of Sciences ser. 4, 60(11): 423–429.
 Johnson R.F. & Gosliner T.M. (2012) Traditional taxonomic groupings mask evolutionary history: A molecular phylogeny and new classification of the chromodorid nudibranchs. PLoS ONE 7(4): e33479

Chromodorididae
Gastropods described in 1902
Taxa named by Theodore Dru Alison Cockerell